The Kenneth Harwood Outstanding Dissertation Award is an academic prize awarded each year by the Broadcast Education Association for the best doctoral dissertation in field of broadcasting and electronic media. The prize was established by Kenneth Harwood, Professor at the University of Houston and a former President of the BEA. The award offers $1,000 for the outstanding Ph.D. dissertation in broadcasting and electronic media. The award was established through gifts started by Professor Harwood and a donation from a friend of BEA.|

Award winners

References

Awards for scholarly publications
Mass media awards